This is a list of Zimbabwean One-day International cricketers displaying career statistics for all players that have represented Zimbabwe in at least one One Day International (ODI). An ODI is an international cricket match between two representative teams, each having ODI status, as determined by the International Cricket Council (ICC). An ODI differs from Test matches in that the number of overs per team is limited, and that each team has only one innings. The list is arranged in the order in which each player won his first ODI cap. Where more than one player won his first ODI cap in the same match, those players are listed alphabetically by surname.

Key

Players

Statistics are correct as of 23 January 2023.

Notes

See also
One Day International
Zimbabwean cricket team
List of Zimbabwe Test cricketers
List of Zimbabwe Twenty20 International cricketers

Notes

External links
Howstat
Cricinfo

References

Zimbabwe ODI
Zimbabwe